Table tennis at the 2011 Southeast Asian Games was held at Soemantri Brodjonegoro Stadium, Jakarta, Indonesia.

Medal summary

Medal table

External links
  2011 Southeast Asian Games

2011
Southeast Asian Games
Table tennis competitions in Indonesia
2011 Southeast Asian Games events
Sport in Jakarta